WCOG (1320 AM) is a radio station broadcasting an oldies format. Licensed to Greensboro, North Carolina, United States, the station serves the Piedmont Triad area. The station is owned by Winston-Salem-Greensboro Broadcasting Co LLC. The station used to be a sports affiliate of Curtis Media but was sold in March 2021.

History
WCOG went on the air in 1947. Throughout the 1960s and 1970s, the station had a top 40 format. Dusty Dunn, Bob Dayton, Scott Derringer, John "Johnny C" Coffman and other DJs played a mix of music that might have included Led Zeppelin, Otis Redding, The Drifters and Janis Joplin. Al Troxler "ruled the airwaves" from above Sky Castle Drive-In on High Point Road.

While attending UNC-Chapel Hill Rick Dees worked for WCOG in 1969 and 1970 when the station was owned by Thoms Broadcasting based in Asheville, NC. Dees left WCOG and worked at WTOB Winston-Salem, NC and WKIX Raleigh, NC when those stations were owned by Southern Broadcasting.

By 1981, WCOG was a country music station. In 1985, the station changed its call sign to WGLD, and its format to beautiful music. A few years later, WGLD changed to satellite-delivered oldies; in 1989, this gave way to an adult standards format provided by the AM Only service. In 1994, the call letters changed to WWWB, and the format to talk radio; WWWB later simulcast WMFR. In 1996 the station changed again to WTCK, "The Ticket", and a sports talk format. The WMFR simulcast returned two years later, after WKEW dropped its talk format for Radio Disney.

In 1999, Truth Broadcasting changed the format to Christian talk and returned the WCOG letters. The new format included Billy Graham, Franklin Graham, Charles Stanley and James Dobson.  WTOB aired the same programming.

On October 2, 2000, WCOG began telling listeners to switch to WTRU. Late in 2000, the announcement came that Truth Broadcasting would move the Radio Disney affiliation from WKEW to WCOG.

The Walt Disney Company bought WCOG in 2005, which meant more community involvement and visibility for the station. Disney subsequently decided to sell its smaller-market Radio Disney stations, and took WCOG and five other stations off the air on January 22, 2010. A sale to Curtis Media Group was announced on March 9; upon taking over, Curtis relaunched the station July 15 with a return to sports talk.In March 2021, WCOG was purchased by Winston-Salem-Greensboro Broadcasting Co LLC and converted back music. It became its own local station in June 2021 broadcasting oldies mid 1960s to the 1980s. Local news and information has returned to WCOG. Greg Rice of Greensboro, is the current station manager.

Programming
WCOG used to air sports programing from Curtis Media.

The station was sold in March 2021 to Winston-Salem-Greensboro Broadcasting Co LLC.

Most of WCOG's programming is now oldies music mid 1960s to 1980s. Local news and information has returned to WCOG.

Translator

References

External links
FCC History Cards for WCOG
Former WCOG website as a Radio Disney station

COG (AM)
Radio stations established in 1947
1947 establishments in North Carolina
Former subsidiaries of The Walt Disney Company